Kaifu District Government station is a subway station in Kaifu District, Changsha, Hunan, China, operated by the Changsha subway operator Changsha Metro. It entered revenue service on June 28, 2016.

History 
The station was opened on 28 June 2016.

Layout

Surrounding area
 Entrance No. 1: Xiangjiang Century City, Kaifu District Government, APTECH (Beida Qingniao)
 Entrance No. 2: Changsha North Bus Station
 Entrance No. 4: Football Park

References

Railway stations in Hunan
Railway stations in China opened in 2016